Memoremea is a genus of flowering plants belonging to the family Boraginaceae.

Its native range is Eastern Central and Eastern Europe.

Species
Species:
 Memoremea scorpioides (Haenke) A.Otero, Jim.Mejías, Valcárcel & P.Vargas

References

Boraginaceae
Boraginaceae genera